José Noguero (March 10, 1905 – March 11, 1993) was a French film and stage actor and comedian. In 1948 he starred in the film The Lame Devil directed by Sacha Guitry. He was the son of Spanish immigrants.  Between 1930 and 1980 he appeared in more than 40 films.

Filmography

Tenderness (1930) as Jarville, L'amant
 L'Arlésienne (1930) as Frédéri
 Dance Hall (1931) as Luisito
 Companion Wanted (1932) as Antonio Mirasol
 In the Name of the Law (1932) Gonzalès
 Orange Blossom (1932) as Alfredo Ramos
  (1932) as Valette
 King of Hotels (1932) as Unknown role
 The Merry Monarch (1933) as The Airman
 Le grand bluff (1933) as Roger Latour
 Die Abenteuer des Königs Pausole (1933) as Giglio
 The Weaker Sex (1933) as Carlos Pinto
 Les aventures du roi Pausole (1933) as Giglio
 The Last Night (1934) as Paul Gérard
 The Last Billionaire (1934) as Band Leader
 Turandot, Princess of China (1935) as Le prince de Samarcande
 Le baron tzigane (1935) as Ernö
 Sous la griffe (1935) as Harry Trelawnay
 La petite sauvage (1935) as Pedro
 Excursion Train (1936) as Verdurin
 Miarka (1937) as Luigi
 The West (1938) as Armand
 Le coeur ébloui  (1938) as René Arnal
 Yamilé sous les cèdres (1939) as Khalil
 The Blue Danube (1940) as Sandor
 Retour de flamme (1943) as Colombière
 Mandrin (1947) as Mandrin
 Le comédien (1948) as Le journaliste argentin
 The Lame Devil (1948) as Le duc de San Carlos
 Forbidden to the Public (1949) as Pepito Papajo
 Le 84 prend des vacances (1950) as Micha Bey
 Nous avons tous fait la même chose de René Sti (1950) as Rémi de la Vieuxville
 Adhémar ou le jouet de la fatalité (1951) as Don Cristobal
 An Artist with Ladies (1952) as Gonzalès Cordeba y Navarro y Vavor
 This Age Without Pity (1952) as Eduardo Tocata
 L'inspecteur connaît la musique (1956) as L'inconnu
 Coplan, agent secret FX 18 (1964) as Le colonel espagnol
 Les enquiquineurs (1966) as Señor de Azucar
 The Looters (1967) as Le diplomate
 Le cavaleur (1979) as le Marquis d'Albufera (final film role)

Theatre
 1935: La guerre de Troie n'aura pas lieu by Jean Giraudoux, directed by Louis Jouvet, Théâtre de l'Athénée
 1935: Supplément au voyage de Cook by Jean Giraudoux, directed by Louis Jouvet, Théâtre de l'Athénée
 1955: Lady 213 by Jean Guitton, directed by Georges Vitaly, Théâtre de la Madeleine
 1957: Feu ! by Yves Chatelain, directed by Paul Abram, Théâtre des Arts
 1962: N'écoutez pas, mesdames ! by Sacha Guitry, directed by Jacques Mauclair, Théâtre de la Madeleine

References

External links

1905 births
1993 deaths
French male film actors
French male stage actors
French comedians
Male actors from Bordeaux
20th-century French male actors
20th-century French comedians